Berkovich is an Ashkenazi Jewish surname. Notable people with the surname include:

E.S. Berkovich, Russian scientist and inventor of the Berkovich hardness indenter
Eyal Berkovich (born 1972), Israeli football player
Miki Berkovich (born 1954), Israeli basketball player
Vladimir Berkovich, Israeli mathematician
Berkovich space in mathematics
Yuli Berkovich, Russian cosmonaut

See also
 Berkovic
 Berković
 Berkovits
 Berkowitz

Jewish surnames
Ukrainian-language surnames